Frank Lewis is an American former Negro league outfielder who played in the 1930s.

Lewis played for the Montgomery Grey Sox in 1932. In 22 recorded games, he posted 23 hits in 87 plate appearances.

References

External links
 and Seamheads

Year of birth missing
Place of birth missing
Montgomery Grey Sox players
Baseball outfielders